Cold wave is a loosely defined music genre that emerged in Europe in the late 1970s, characterized by its detached lyrical tone, use of early electronic music instruments and a minimalist approach and style. It emerged from punk rock bands who, influenced by early electronic groups such as Kraftwerk, made use of affordable portable synthesizers such as the Korg MS-20. The term can also refer to music otherwise described as "dark wave", "goth", "deathrock", "minimal wave" or "minimal synth".

Characteristics
"Cold wave" is a loose descriptor, derived from "new wave", that was originally reserved for a collection of punk and electronic styles from the 1970s. The scope of the genre has evolved continuously throughout its history. Writing in his 2018 book Popmusik in Zeiten der Digitalisierung, Robert Selfert notes that the term is "controversial" among dedicated fans who debate its definition and epoch in relation to numerous alternative terms. The SAGE Handbook of Popular Music (2014) offers that the term is an early synonym for what was later termed "dark wave", "goth", and "deathrock". According to Treblezine contributor Jeff Terich, in later years, "cold wave" was subsumed under the retrospective labels "minimal wave" or "minimal synth".

According to Tom Watson of Crack magazine, "the collective sound [of cold wave] was controlled yet ‘colder’ than that of their snotty predecessors – punk, with a depressive groove." Watson also identified "less guitar work, more analogue experimentation, militant rhythm sections and, above all else, a vehemently do-it-yourself attitude" as a part of cold wave's shared ideology. The Guardians Louis Pattison has stated that during the 1980s French cold wave bands such as Les Provisoires and Asylum Party "started playing gloomy post-punk in their native tongue, inspired by the icy guitars and studio-produced drum sounds pioneered by Factory Records producer Martin Hannett."

History

Origins (1970s and 1980s)

The term "cold wave" appeared in the 26 November 1977 issue of  UK weekly music paper Sounds. The caption of its cover picture, showing Kraftwerk's Ralf Hütter and Florian Schneider was "New musick:  The cold wave". That year, Kraftwerk released Trans-Europe Express. The term was repeated the following week in Sounds by journalist Vivien Goldman, in an article about Siouxsie and the Banshees. In 1977, Siouxsie and the Banshees described their music as "cold, machine-like and passionate at the same time", and Sounds magazine prophecised about the band: "[they] sound like a 21st century industrial plant [...] Listen to the cold wave roar from the '70s into the '80s".

A scene of French, Belgian and Polish musicians, dubbed "cold wave", emerged between the late 1970s and early 1980s. The French scene was also known as "la vague froide," which was a term coined by the French music press to describe the sound of the band Marquis de Sade. According to Vice, the most notable acts were Marquis de Sade, Asylum Party, and Twilight Ritual. Brave Punk World author James Greene cited Marquis de Sade's 1979 album Dantzig Twist as "a classic" of the genre. He also referenced KaS Product as a group that "pushed cold wave to icier places in the early 1980s and ended up one of its preeminent voices." In The SAGE International Encyclopedia of Music and Culture (2019), Eric S. Strother identified Ruth, Charles de Goal, Marquis de Sade, KaS Product, Asylum Party, and Resistance as "significant early cold wave groups".

According to Pieter Schoolwerth, who was involved in the scene during 1980s, coldwave artists and cassette labels communicated through an underground cassette culture; Alain Neffe's Insane Music label in Belgium was heavily active in European cassette culture. Schoolwerth also stated that Al Margolis of New York's Sound of Pig Tapes and Chris Phinney of Tennessee's Harsh Reality Music, who were active in the industrial/experimental music scene, were largely responsible from introducing minimal synth and cold wave artists to the United States.

Resurgence (2000s)
Wierd Records is credited with establishing interest in the style in the US, while The Liberty Snake Club did much to popularize it within the UK. The Tigersushi Records compilation So Young but So Cold, compiled by Ivan Smagghe, is one document of the scene. Crack journalist Tom Watson referenced Angular Recordings' Cold Waves and Minimal Electronics (2010) as a "crucial" compilation.

Wierd Records' weekly Wednesday night party in New York was described by The Guardian journalist Louis Pattinson as the locus of the cold wave and minimal synth revival of the early 2000s. Artists who performed at these parties included Blacklist, Xeno & Oaklander and Led Er Est.

British-German Lebanon Hanover, an influential band in the resurgence, formed in 2010.

In the early 2020s Belarusian band Molchat Doma, have found success through their sound which is deeply rooted in the cold wave sound and aesthetic. A similar group is the Russian group Ploho. The gloomy post-punk style of the post-USSR territories of Belarus and Russia simultaneously became associated with "Russian doomer music" playlists.

The Ukrainian band Sexual Purity creates a purely electronic, EBM-influenced variant of Cold wave, characterised by an emphasis on dark basslines and gloomy, sensual female vocals.

References

Bibliography 

 

 
Gothic music genres
Dark wave
New wave music
Goth subculture
Cassette culture 1970s–1990s
Post-punk

de:Dark Wave#Cold Wave